Maciej Rychta (born February 25, 1951 in Nowy Sącz) is a Polish slalom canoeist who competed in the 1970s. He won two bronze medals in the C-2 team event at the ICF Canoe Slalom World Championships, earning them in 1975 and 1977. He also finished 17th in the C-2 event at the 1972 Summer Olympics in Munich.

References
Sports-reference.com profile

1951 births
Canoeists at the 1972 Summer Olympics
Living people
Olympic canoeists of Poland
Polish male canoeists
Sportspeople from Nowy Sącz
Medalists at the ICF Canoe Slalom World Championships